Ayaka Hosoda (細田采花) (Born February 3, 1995) is a Japanese figure skater.

Early life 
Hosoda skated for the first time at 7 years old, and started training in earnest at 8 years old. She trained with coach Utako Nagamitsu until high school, when she changed coaches to Mie Hamada.

Career 
Hosoda landed three clean triple axels at the 2018 Japan National Championships. She finished 8th overall, her highest ever placement at the National Championships.

Programs

Competitive highlights 
JGP: Junior Grand Prix

References 

Living people
1995 births
Kansai University alumni
Japanese female single skaters
People from Suita
Sportspeople from Osaka Prefecture